Emma Mullin (born 4 March 1985) is an Irish ladies' Gaelic footballer and association footballer. In Gaelic football, she won the All-Ireland Senior Ladies' Football Championship four times with Mayo GAA. In association football, she has played for the Republic of Ireland women's national football team.

Gaelic football career

Mullin was part of the Mayo GAA side that lost the 2001 All-Ireland Senior Ladies' Football Championship Final, and won the league in 2002. In 2003, she was one of 11 Mayo players nominated for an All Star player award. In 2009, she scored in the GAA National League semi-final, and played in the All-Ireland semi-final. She scored in the 2009 Connacht final, as Mayo beat Galway. In total, she won four All Ireland Championships with Mayo. She also has a Gaelic football coaching qualification.

Association football career

In 2006, Mullin represented a Mayo Women's Football League team which won the 2006 FAI Women's Cup. She competed in the football event at the 2007 Summer Universiade, and so was unavailable to play for the Mayo Ladies team in the 2007–08 UEFA Women's Cup. In 2008, Mullin joined Women's National League team Castlebar Celtic. She scored 10 goals in the 2011–12 Women's National League. She scored in the 2013 FAI Women's Cup Final; Castlebar Celtic lost the match 3–2 to Raheny United. A persistent ankle injury forced Mullin's retirement from playing after the 2013–14 season.

Mullin has played for the Ireland Colleges international team, and made one appearance for the Republic of Ireland B team. In 2012, Mullin made her first appearance for the Republic of Ireland women's national football team in an Algarve Cup match against Hungary. She was the first Castlebar Celtic player to represent the Republic of Ireland team. She also played for Ireland in UEFA Women's Euro 2013 qualifying matches.

Mullin has worked as an association football coach in Ballina, County Mayo. In 2010, she became the Football Facilitator at the Institute of Technology, Sligo (IT Sligo). Whilst in the role, IT Sligo won an Irish futsal tournament.

Personal life
Mullin is from Frenchbrook, Kilmaine, Ireland. She has a degree in business from IT Sligo, and a master's degree in Exercise and Sports Management at University College Dublin.

References

Republic of Ireland women's international footballers
1985 births
Living people
Mayo inter-county ladies' footballers
Castlebar Celtic W.F.C. players
Women's National League (Ireland) players
Alumni of the Institute of Technology, Sligo
Alumni of University College Dublin
Association footballers from County Mayo
Competitors at the 2007 Summer Universiade
Women's association football forwards
Republic of Ireland women's association footballers